Aeterne rerum conditor (English "Eternal Maker of all") is an early Christian hymn among those attributed to Ambrose of Milan. 

A dawn hymn, the hymn refers to Lucifer, the Morning Star, Christ, following 2 Peter 1:19 "until the day dawns and the morning star arises in your hearts". The hymn, as in the Vulgate of 2 Peter, employs the Latin noun "lucifer" to refer to "the Bringer of Light". Lines 15-16 refer to the denial of Peter.

The poem is written in the iambic tetrameter metre. The lines form couplets, each couplet having the rhythm | u – u – | u – u – || u – u – | u – u – |.

In the Roman Breviary of 1632, some small changes were made to the wording in stanzas 2, 3, 7 and 8.

See also
Ambrosian hymns

References

4th century in music
Latin-language Christian hymns

External links
Further information on the hymn.